Menglian Dai, Lahu and Va Autonomous County is an autonomous county in the southwest of Yunnan Province, China, bordering Ximeng County to the north, Lancang County to the north, northeast, and east, and Burma's Shan State to the south and west. It is the westernmost county-level division of Pu'er City

Administrative divisions
Menglian Dai, Lahu and Va Autonomous County comprises five towns and two townships.
Towns

Townships
 Jingxin
 Gongxin

Climate

See also
Mong Lem
Dai people
Lahu people
Va people

References

External links
Menglian County Official Site

County-level divisions of Pu'er City
Dai autonomous counties
Lahu autonomous counties
Wa autonomous counties